Myrne may refer to:

Places in Ukraine 
 Myrne, Myrne settlement hromada, Volnovakha Raion, Dometsk Oblast
 Myrne, Skadovsk Raion, Kherson Oblast
 
 
 Myrne, Luhansk Oblast
 Myrne, Izmail Raion, Odesa Oblast
 Myrne, Polohy Raion, Zaporizhzhia Oblast
 Myrne, Myrne settlement hromada, Melitopol Raion, Zaporizhzhia Oblast

Other uses 
 Myrne (musician), published by NoCopyrightSounds

See also